Munroe Effect were an underground alternative rock band formed in the summer of 2006, in Portsmouth England. Since the debut single release "Who's Throwing Rocks/Subterranean Death Clash" in 2008, the band have released a 6-track EP you are goldmouth and their first album, ULTRAVIOLENCELAND, named after a Camille Rose Garcia painting. Munroe Effect is derived from Charles Edward Munroe's theory the Neumann Effect, otherwise known as the Munroe Effect.

Personnel
Daniel Sutton-Johanson - Vocals
Andrew Waterman - Guitar
Richard Worrall - Bass
Jack Stephens - Drums

Ultraviolenceland
After a family loss in late 2010, ULTRAVIOLENCELAND was finally released after a three-month delay on 30 May 2011 on Dead Planet Records, London. Since the release Munroe Effect toured extensively throughout the UK embarking on tours with The Subways, Young Guns and Gay for Johnny Depp.

Discography

References

English alternative rock groups